To the Heart  (Spanish title: Al Corazón) is a 1996 Argentine documentary musical film dancing directed and written by Mario Sábato. The film starred Libertad Lamarque and Alberto Castillo. The film explores the history of tango dancing in Argentina, and was filmed in Buenos Aires, Argentina.

Cast
 Olinda Bozán
 Enrique Cadícamo - Narrator
 Alberto Castillo -
 Hugo del Carril -
 Libertad Lamarque -
 Tita Merello -
 Florencio Parravicini -
 Sergio Renán - Narrator
 Ernesto Sábato - Narrator
 Luis Sandrini -
 Adriana Varela - Narrator

Release and acclaim
The film was produced both in black and white and in colour. It premiered on 22 March 1996. In 1997, Al Corazón's film editor Norberto Rapado won a Silver condor award for Best Film Editing at the Argentinean Film Critics Association Awards.

External links
 

1996 films
1990s Spanish-language films
Argentine documentary films
1990s musical films
1996 documentary films
Documentary films about tango
Films shot in Buenos Aires
Films set in Buenos Aires
1990s dance films
Films directed by Mario Sábato
1990s Argentine films